Jujeh Heydar (also Romanized as Jūjeh Ḩeydar and Jūjeh Haidar; also known as Chakwal and Chūval) is a village in Bardesareh Rural District, Oshtorinan District, Borujerd County, Lorestan Province, Iran. At the 2006 census, its population was 869, in 182 families.

References 

Towns and villages in Borujerd County